Gunung Api may refer to:

 Api Siau, a cone volcano on the island of Siau, Sangihe Islands
 Banda Api or Gunung Api, an island volcano in the Banda Islands
 Sangeang Api, an active complex volcano on the island of Sangeang
 Mount Api, a limestone mountain in Sarawak, Borneo